The Alzheimer Society of Ontario (ASO) is a care and research charity committed to helping people living with Alzheimer's disease and other dementias by:
 Providing care, support, information and education for people with dementia
 Funding research to find a cure
 Educating decision-makers about the need for improved health-care services 
 Increasing awareness about dementia

History 
1983: the Alzheimer Society of Ontario is founded by Madeline Honeyman. After her husband was diagnosed with Alzheimer's disease, Honeyman found hundreds of other individuals facing the same issues and problems. She co-founded the ASO as a way to unify the people who were struggling with the disease.

1989: the Alzheimer Society Research Program (ASRP) is launched - a collaborative initiative between the Alzheimer Societies across Canada, partners and donors.

1990: the official opening of the Tanz Centre for Research in Neurodegenerative Diseases established by the University of Toronto with the support of the Alzheimer Society of Ontario. In 1995, Peter St. George-Hyslop at the Tanz Centre would go on to discover two genes, called presenilins, associated with the early onset Alzheimer's disease.

1999: Ontario government announces a provincial Alzheimer Strategy with $68.4 million in funding.

2006: ASO helps launch the Alzheimer Knowledge Exchange (AKE), a web-based forum that links people, ideas and resources to spread the word about innovations in care.

2007: ASO launches First Link, a program connecting people with recent diagnoses of dementia to their local society.

2012: ASO completes a commitment to donate $12 million to the Tanz CRND since it was founded in 1990.

2017: The Province of Ontario commits to a provincial wide dementia strategy led by the minister for seniors.

Local Societies 
Staff and volunteers in 30 Alzheimer Societies across Ontario provide support programs, educational resources and referral services to ease the burden of care and improve the quality of life for people living with Alzheimer's disease and other dementias. These include:
 Memory clinics for early detection 
 Education and information sessions
 Support groups
 Private and family counselling
 Respite care – short term overnight stays to alleviate caregiver burden
 Art and music programs

Local Societies also host events to promote awareness and raise funds for research. Coffee Break is the Alzheimer Society's major nationwide annual fundraiser where friends, co-workers and customers gather in communities across Canada to raise funds for local Alzheimer Societies. Participants at these events make a donation in exchange for a cup of coffee. The money raised stays in that province or community to help support local programs and services.

Walk for Alzheimer's is Canada's biggest fundraiser for Alzheimer's disease and other dementias. Money raised supports programs and services in communities that improve the quality of life for people living with dementia and their families.

Developing new programs and services 
The Alzheimer Society of Ontario develops new programs for people impacted by Alzheimer's disease and other dementias. First Link is an innovative program that gives people with dementia and their caregivers and families a direct connection to information and services in their own communities. Ontarians living with dementia receive information about diagnosis, day-to-day living, and positive approaches to care and how to prepare for the end of life. The program also provides individual support and counselling and links people with the disease to other Alzheimer Society programs and services.

Finding Your Way is a program that raises awareness of the risks of people with dementia going missing and helps to prevent such incidents from occurring. In conjunction with Finding Your Way, Medic Alert: Safely Home helps police find people with dementia who are missing and return them home safely.

Educating decision-makers 
Alzheimer's disease and other dementias have the potential to overwhelm Ontario's health-care system. ASO campaigns for improved health and social services and a workforce qualified to support people with dementia. A network of volunteer Dementia Champions across the province supports their requests for greater support for those living with the disease and their families.

Funding world class research 
Since its foundation, the Alzheimer Society of Ontario has been committed to funding research to bring an end to the disease. The Alzheimer Society Research Program, a collaborative effort between the ASO, Alzheimer Society of Canada and its partners, provides research grants and training awards to support the vital work of Canadian investigators in biomedical research as well as social and psychological aspects of the disease.

The Alzheimer Society Research Program (ASRP) has contributed over $30 million to world class Canadian research, with $12 million dedicated to the Tanz CRND since it was founded in 1990.

Dementia in Ontario by the numbers 
Currently, over 200,000 Ontarians over the age of 65 have dementia, and, by 2020, will lead to approximately 250,000 Ontarians - roughly 1 in 10 seniors. Women make up almost three quarters of those who have Alzheimer's disease.

See also
Alzheimer's Association, based in the United States
Alzheimer's Disease International, based in the United Kingdom
Alzheimer's Society, based in the United Kingdom
National Institute on Aging, a division of the U.S. National Institutes of Health
Journal of Alzheimer's Disease

References

Ontario Seniors' Secretariat: January Is Alzheimer Awareness Month January 2, 2006
Ontario Ministry of Citizenship - Ontario's Strategy for Alzheimer Disease and Related Dementia
Canada Helps - Alzheimer Society of Ontario
Toronto Star, June 13, 2006 - New drug offers hope against Alzheimer's - AZD-103 found by U of T researchers Shown to reverse some damage from disease Part of a research study which is a collaboration between the University of Toronto and the Alzheimer Society of Ontario, funded by both federal and provincial research organizations.
Dementia Amidst Complexity - 2012

External links
Alzheimer Society of Ontario

Alzheimer's and dementia organizations
Mental health organizations in Canada
Health charities in Canada
Medical and health organizations based in Ontario
Organizations established in 1983
1983 establishments in Ontario